Lance Carter (May 11, 1955 – November 1, 2006) was an American jazz drummer and percussionist. A musician for more than 30 years, he is recognized for his work with Grammy Award-winning artist Cassandra Wilson and as a long-time collaborator of Sonny Sharrock, with whom he recorded the theme song to the Cartoon Network series Space Ghost Coast to Coast.

Biography
Born in New Brunswick, New Jersey, Carter graduated in 1973 from Highland Park High School and began attending the Berklee College of Music, where he studied percussion. In 1976, he returned to New Jersey to play with the dance band Network. He died in November 2006 from primary systemic amyloidosis, an incurable bone marrow disease.

Partial discography
Raw Meet (Intakt, 2004) with Elliott Sharp and Melvin Gibbs 
Live at the Bowery Poetry Project (2007) with Bill Laswell and Robert Musso
With Sonny Sharrock
Highlife (Enemy, 1990)
Space Ghost Coast to Coast (Cartoon Network, 1994)
With Cassandra WilsonBlue Light 'til Dawn'' (Blue Note, 1993)

References

External links

1955 births
2006 deaths
Free jazz drummers
African-American jazz musicians
Avant-garde jazz drummers
Musicians from New Brunswick, New Jersey
20th-century American drummers
American male drummers
Deaths from skeletal disease
20th-century American male musicians
American male jazz musicians
Machine Gun (band) members
Berklee College of Music alumni
Highland Park High School (New Jersey) alumni
People from Highland Park, New Jersey
Intakt Records artists
20th-century African-American musicians
21st-century African-American people